The Definitive Collection is a greatest hits compilation by Australian rock group Little River Band, released in 2002. The album debuted and peaked on the ARIA chart in April 2015 at number 32 and was certified double platinum.

Track listing

Personnel 
Glenn Shorrock - lead vocals (tracks 01-15)
Graeham Goble - guitars and backing vocals (all tracks)
Beeb Birtles - guitars and backing vocals (tracks 01-18)
Derek Pellicci - drums (tracks 01-18)
Ric Formosa - lead guitar (tracks 01-04)
Roger McLachlan - bass guitar (tracks 01-04)
David Briggs - lead guitar (tracks 05-15)
George McArdle - bass guitar (tracks 05-11)
Wayne Nelson - lead vocals and bass guitar (track 13), bass guitar and backing vocals (tracks 14-19)
Stephen Housden - lead guitar (tracks 16-19)
John Farnham - lead vocals (tracks 16-19)
David Hirschfelder - keyboards (tracks 16, 19)
Steve Prestwich - drums (track 19)

Additional personnel
Geoff Skewes - clavinet
Gary Hyde - percussion
Ian Piano - acoustic piano
Bobby Venier - trumpets, flugelhorn
Peter Salt - trumpets
Don Lock - trombone
Tony Buchanan - tenor saxophone
Graeme Lyall - alto saxophone
Peter Sullivan - piano
Peter Jones - electric piano
Clive Harrison - bass guitar
Mike Clarke - bass guitar
Bill Harrower - tenor saxophone

Charts

Certifications

References

2002 greatest hits albums
Little River Band albums
Compilation albums by Australian artists
Capitol Records compilation albums
EMI Records compilation albums